The Peterborough–Quorn railway line was a  railway line on the South Australian Railways network. Located in the upper Mid North of South Australia, it  opened from  Peterborough to Orroroo  on 23 November 1881, being extended to Quorn on 22 May 1882.

Following the opening of the Trans-Australian Railway in 1917 it became part of the main east-west railway across Australia from Sydney to Perth. This ceased in 1937 when the Trans-Australian Railway was altered to operate via Port Pirie.

At the time it was built, Quorn was on the Central Australia Railway from Port Augusta to Alice Springs, and Peterborough was on the Port Pirie–Broken Hill railway line from Port Pirie to Broken Hill.

It closed between Eurelia and Quorn on 3 March 1987, and Peterborough and Eurelia on 22 November 1988. After closure, part of the line was used by the Steamtown Peterborough Railway Preservation Society.

The stations south to north on the line were Peterborough, Black Rock, Orroroo, Walloway, Eurelia, Carrieton, Moockra, Hammond, Bruce and Quorn.

References

Closed railway lines in South Australia
Railway lines opened in 1881
Railway lines closed in 1988
1881 establishments in Australia
1988 disestablishments in Australia